Paul Kevin Blair (born August 3, 1963) is a former American football player who played as an offensive tackle in the National Football League (NFL) from 1986 to 1990. Born in Edmond, Oklahoma, he attended Edmond Memorial High School and Oklahoma State University, before being drafted by the Chicago Bears in the fourth round (110th overall) of the 1986 NFL Draft. He played in 14 games in his rookie season for the defending Super Bowl champions, as the team went 14–2 and reached the playoffs for a third season in a row. He played 11 more times the following season, including the only postseason appearance of his career against the Washington Redskins, but did not play in 1988 and left for the Denver Broncos in 1989; however, he did not play that season either, and joined the Minnesota Vikings for the 1990 season. There he played in just two games before a knee injury forced him to retire from professional football.

After his retirement, Blair followed in his father's footsteps and became a Christian pastor, but also remained involved in football as a broadcaster, announcing Oklahoma high school football games with former University of Oklahoma placekicker Tim Lashar, and also analyzing college football games for an Oklahoma City television station.

References

External links

1963 births
Living people
Sportspeople from Edmond, Oklahoma
Players of American football from Oklahoma
American football offensive tackles
Oklahoma State Cowboys football players
Chicago Bears players
Denver Broncos players
Minnesota Vikings players
Edmond Memorial High School alumni